Jabal Al-Majāz ("Mount Metaphor") is a mountain in the Sarawat range, 'Asir Region of Saudi Arabia, near the Yemeni border. At  in height, it is one of the tallest mountains in the Saudi Kingdom.

See also
 Asir Mountains

References

'Asir Province
Majaz